Mautern in Steiermark is a municipality in the district of Leoben in Styria, Austria.

Twin towns
Mautern in Steiermark is twinned with:

  Mautern an der Donau, Austria (1983)
  Tipperary, Ireland (2006)

References

Cities and towns in Leoben District